Domus Mundi is the first album by Austrian symphonic death metal band Hollenthon, released by Napalm Records in 1999. The lyrics for "Reprisal - Malis Avibus" are based on Percy Bysshe Shelley's "Peter Bell the Third".

Track listing
Music by Martin Schirenc, lyrics by Elena Schirenc.

 "Enrapture - Hinc Illae Lacrimae" - 5:33
 "Homage - Magni Nominis Umbra" - 6:05
 "Vestige - Non Omnis Moriar" - 7:18
 "Lure - Pallida Mors" - 4:15
 "Interlude - Ultima Ratio Regum" - 3:47
 "Reprisal - Malis Avibus" - 4:26
 "Premonition - Lex Talionis" - 4:59
 "Eclipse - Vita Nova" - 8:49

Personnel

Hollenthon
 Martin Schirenc - vocals, guitars, bass, keyboards
 Mike Gröger - drums and percussion
 Elena Schirenc - vocals

Production
Martin Schirenc - producer, engineer, mixing and mastering, cover concept and layout

References

Hollenthon albums
1999 debut albums
Napalm Records albums